The Iron Wall  is an essay written by Ze'ev Jabotinsky in 1923. It was originally published in Russian, as he was born in Russia as Vladimir Yevgenyevich Zhabotinsky and wrote for the Russian press.

He wrote the essay after the British Colonial Secretary Winston Churchill prohibited Zionist settlement on the east bank of the Jordan River, and formed the Zionist Revisionist party after writing it.

Jabotinsky argued that the Palestinian Arabs would not agree to a Jewish majority in Palestine, and that "Zionist colonisation must either stop, or else proceed regardless of the native population. Which means that it can proceed and develop only under the protection of a power that is independent of the native population – behind an iron wall, which the native population cannot breach." The only solution to achieve peace and a Jewish state in the Land of Israel, he argued, would be for Jews to first establish a strong Jewish state, which would eventually prompt the Arabs to "drop their extremist leaders, whose watchword is ‘never!’ and pass the leadership to the moderate groups, who will approach us with a proposal that we should both agree to mutual concessions."

A week following the publication of this essay, Jabotinsky followed with "The Ethics of the Iron Wall," in which he argued that morality comes before everything else, and that Zionism is "moral and just," since it subscribes to "national self-determination" as a "sacred principle," which Arabs may also enjoy.

Impact of the essay 
The moderate Zionists criticized Jabotinsky's essay for the implications of the use of military force. However, moderate Zionists did comply with the notion that the Zionist effort was a positive and just force, with Jabotinsky elaborating that for this very reason, resistance from those that attempt to stop it should be disregarded. Jabotinsky furthermore met with opposition from the Marxist influenced Zionist Labor Party, led by David Ben-Gurion. The Labor Party sought to reach statehood without military means; eventually, they recognized the use of military force in maintaining the state. Though his resolve to utilize military force to further the Zionist goals was frowned upon by both the moderate Zionists and the Zionists of the Labor Party, Jabotinsky would not let go of his conviction. His essay would go to form the fundamentals for the understanding of Revisionist Zionism. His ideas would not only work to influence the Revisionist Zionists but the Zionist movement as a whole.

Analyses

Avi Shlaim's analysis 
In Avraham "Avi" Shlaim's 2000 work, "The Iron Wall: Israel and the Arab World," Shlaim gives a brief overview of the background and history of Ze'ev Jabotinsky. In his work, Shlaim elaborates on Jabotinsky's Zionist Revisionist ideals. In his analysis of Jabotinksky's work, Shlaim noted Jabotinsky's argument that efforts to establish a Jewish state would require the assistance of European Western powers. Shlaim's analysis of The Iron Wall finds that Jabotinsky's followers considered the ideas put forth in the essay to be the basis for Revisionist Zionism. However, Shlaim also concluded that the meaning behind the ideas devised by Jabotinsky was not fully understood, even by his followers. Shlaim stressed that Jabotinsky saw the "Iron Wall" not as an end to establishing a Jewish state, but simply as a means to end Arab hostility towards the Zionist movement. Palestinian Arabs, according to Jabotinsky, would be privy to national rights in the newly formed Jewish state. Shlaim notes that the nature of these rights is vague, though political autonomy of Arab Palestinians is suggested. Shlaim emphasizes Jabotinsky's acknowledgement of the Palestinian Arab national idenitity in his essay; and underlines Jabotinsky's belief that a military intervention is the only way to realise a Jewish state.

References

External links

1923 essays
Ze'ev Jabotinsky